Zlydzens are hazardous creatures in Belarusian mythology. These mythological characters often live under the masonry stove.

Description
In the fairy-tales and myths of Belarusian nation Zlydzens are usually described as small, humpbacked and nasty creatures that remind one of cats and dogs at the same time. They often wear big boots and hats with earflaps.

Mode of life
These creatures are engaged in all sorts of harmful and damaging activities and ruin everything around them, quickly trying to make a mess. In Belarusian folklore it is said that Zlydzens are sometimes drawn to the homes of individuals who want to become rich quickly and of greedy owners.

Zlydzens play their nasty tricks in groups because, like many other small and harmful creatures, they are cowards and are afraid to act alone. When the owner leaves the house, Zlydzens emerge from their shelter and make a mess. They damage utensils, pour milk from pitchers; pans fly around the house. Cries of Zlydzens are heard all around the village. Zlydzens are always engaged in all sorts of harmful and damaging activities, and are constantly making a mess.

See also
 Boggart
 Damavik
 Dzedka
 Gremlin
 Lazavik
 Poltergeist
 Shatans
 Younik
 Zheuzhyk
 Zhytsen

References

Mythology
Slavic mythology